Valio Ltd is a Finnish manufacturer of dairy products and one of the largest companies in Finland. Valio's products include cheese, powdered ingredients, butter, yogurt and milk. It is Finland's largest milk processor, producing 85% of the country's milk.

Valio's net turnover in 2012 was 2 billion euros. Valio is the market leader in key dairy product categories in Finland and a pioneer as the developer of functional foods. Valio is owned by 18 dairy cooperatives which have about 7,900 milk farmers as members. Valio's product range currently consists of about 1,000 products. Valio is Finland’s biggest food exporter and sells products to nearly 60 countries. In 2015 Valio’s share of Finland’s dairy product exports was around 97%, and that of Finland’s food exports around 29%.

Valio has 15 production facilities in Finland, two in Estonia and a plant for producing processed cheese and a logistics centre in Moscow, Russia. Valio subsidiaries operate in Russia, Sweden, the Baltic, United States and China. International operations account for one third of Valio net turnover.

History
Valio was founded in 1905 by 17 co-operative dairies. The company was originally based in Hanko and the most important market was England.

Valio's activities expanded from butter to other dairy products in 1909, and by the 1920s Valio's marketing in Finland was bigger than abroad.

Artturi Ilmari Virtanen, who received the Nobel Prize in Chemistry, was an employee of Valio. The prize was given "for his research and inventions in agricultural and nutrition chemistry, especially for his fodder preservation method". Virtanen's work preserved nutrients in hay, which lead cows to produce more nutritious milk.

In 2001, Valio launched a lactose-free milk drink which is not sweet like HYLA milk but has the fresh taste of ordinary milk. Valio patented the chromatographic separation method to remove lactose. Valio also markets these products in Sweden, Estonia, and the United States, where the company says ultrafiltration is used.

In Belgium the products were present under the Valio brand until 2013, but the name changed after Valio sold their Belgian subsidiary in 2012. The brand is now called Dilea  and the drink is still made using the Valio process.

Valio sold its ice cream activity to overseas company Nestlé in 2004. Nestlé also received the right to use the  name for 10 years, ending in 2014. It was soon transferred into the Nestle/R&R Ice Cream joint venture Froneri Finland.

In 2005,  (Valio Ice Cream Bar), designed by Paola Suhonen, was opened in Kamppi Center, Helsinki.

In 2007, Valio invested approx. €60 million in a factory near Moscow for the packaging of cheese and butter for the Russian market as well as for logistics operations from Moscow up to the Pacific Ocean. The products were mostly imported from the mother company in Finland. The production capacity of the plant was 8,000 Mt per year with 400 employees and could be expanded up to 20,000 Mt. The turnover of Valio in Russia was €283 million in 2010, making it the biggest Finnish consumer business on the Russian market after Nokia.
After Russia imposed sanctions on the EU, butter made by Valio appeared in supermarkets in the USA under the FINLANDIA brand.

References

External links

 Official site

Food and drink companies of Finland
Finnish brands
Manufacturing companies based in Helsinki
Ice cream brands